Dany Island is a tropical island in Sanma Province of Vanuatu in the Pacific Ocean with full-time on-site staff. The island is a tourist destination for snorkeling, scuba diving, beach bar and grill, surfing, and deep-sea fishing. There is a newly built villa for rent there, overlooking the Dany Island surf break and the distant volcano on Ambae Island.

Geography
Dany Island lies close to Espiritu Santo along with a number of many other small islands and islets; among them are: Araki, Elephant Island, Sakao, Lataroa, Lataro, Thion, Malohu, Malwepe, Malvapevu, Malparavu, Maltinerava, Oyster Island, Tangoa, and Bokissa. Dany Island is surrounded by 50,000sqm of tropical reefs inhabited by an array of tropical fish and sea turtles.

Popular culture and fame
Dany Island is the subject of pop hit radio song My Private Paradise - Dany Island by Tujah and Vanessa Quai about their love for this tropical paradise island.

Uniqueness and valuation
Dany Island is considered to have a unique combination of active tropical reefs (tropical fish, sea turtles, corals), a surf break, sandy beaches, self-sufficiency with water and power. Dany Island is also close to the mainland (1.5 km) and an international airport (Santo-Pekoa International Airport) and has a current valuation estimate of $4.7million USD.

References

Islands of Vanuatu
Sanma Province